James Livingston (born March 8, 1990) is a Canadian professional ice hockey player. He is currently a free agent.

He had most recently played for Fife Flyers in the UK EIHL. He previously played with EC Bad Nauheim of the DEL2 and UK EIHL side Cardiff Devils. Livingston was selected by the St. Louis Blues in the 3rd round (70th overall) of the 2008 NHL Entry Draft.

Playing career
Livingston played five seasons (2006-2011) of major junior hockey in the Ontario Hockey League (OHL) where he scored 82 goals and 91 assists for 173 points in 316 games played. In 2008 Livingston was selected to play in the CHL Top Prospects Game.

On March 11, 2011, the  San Jose Sharks of the National Hockey League signed Livingston as a free agent to an entry-level contract. Livingston made his professional debut in the American Hockey League with the Worcester Sharks during the 2011–12 season.

In the final year of his contract with the Sharks, and his third season with Worcester, at the 2013–14 trade deadline he was traded to the Los Angeles Kings for a conditional draft pick on March 5, 2014. He was immediately assigned to AHL affiliate, the Manchester Monarchs for the remainder of the season.

On September 23, 2014, unable to attain NHL interest, Livingston was signed to a standard player contract with the Idaho Steelheads of the ECHL.

On July 3, 2015, Livingston decided to pursue a European career, signing a one-year contract with Austrian club, Dornbirner EC of the EBEL.

After a spell in DEL2 with EC Bad Nauheim, Livingston moved to the UK Elite Ice Hockey League to sign for Cardiff Devils in January 2019. He departed at the end of the 2018-19 season.

On August 9, 2019, Livingston penned a one-year deal with Cardiff's EIHL counterparts Fife Flyers, whom he would go on to captain.

On October 12, 2020, Livingston moved to Slovakia to sign for HK Poprad.

Career statistics

Regular season and playoffs

References

External links

1990 births
Living people
Canadian ice hockey right wingers
Dornbirn Bulldogs players
Ice hockey people from Nova Scotia
Idaho Steelheads (ECHL) players
Manchester Monarchs (AHL) players
Plymouth Whalers players
St. Louis Blues draft picks
Sault Ste. Marie Greyhounds players
Sportspeople from Halifax, Nova Scotia
Springfield Falcons players
Worcester Sharks players
Cardiff Devils players
Fife Flyers players
HK Poprad players
Graz 99ers players
Canadian expatriate ice hockey players in Austria
Canadian expatriate ice hockey players in the United States
Canadian expatriate ice hockey players in Germany
Canadian expatriate ice hockey players in Wales
Canadian expatriate ice hockey players in Scotland
Canadian expatriate ice hockey players in Slovakia
Canadian expatriate ice hockey players in Denmark